Suez is a seaport town in north-eastern Egypt. 

Suez may also refer to:

Geography 
Gulf of Suez, at the northern end of the Red Sea
Isthmus of Suez, land strip connecting the continents of Africa and Asia
Suez Canal, an artificial sea-level waterway in Egypt, connecting the Mediterranean Sea to the Red Sea
Suez Port, a port located at the southern boundary of Suez Canal

Other uses 

 Suez Company (1858–1997), a French corporation
 Suez (company, 1997–2008), a successor French multinational corporation
 Suez (company, 2015), formerly Suez Environnement, a former division of the previous company
Suez (film), a 1938 epic film starring Tyrone Power and Loretta Young
Suez Cement, an Egyptian football club based in Suez
Suez Stadium, a multi-use stadium in Suez

See also 
 Suez Crisis, a war fought in Egypt in 1956
Suez Steel, a steel company located in Ababia, Egypt
Suez Canal (disambiguation)